Hermannia is a genus of mites that includes several dozen described species. Typically they dwell in moss, feeding partly on fungi.

References

Sarcoptiformes
Arachnids of Australia